Mireille Delunsch (born 2 November 1962) is a French soprano. She was born in Mulhouse, and studied musicology and voice at the Conservatoire de Strasbourg. Her debut was at the Opéra national du Rhin in Mulhouse, in Mussorgsky's Boris Godunov.

Her repertory is wide, from Baroque opera to 20th-century art songs, with an emphasis on French music. She is well known for the operas she has sung under the direction of French conductor Marc Minkowski.

Recordings
Among the operas Delunsch has recorded with Minkowski are:
La dame blanche by Boïeldieu (1996, released 1997, EMI Classics) - Jenny
Armide by Gluck (1996, released 1999, Archiv) - Armide
Dardanus by Rameau (1998, released 2000, Archiv) - Vénus
Iphigénie en Tauride by Gluck (1999, released 2001, Archiv) - Iphigénie
Orphée et Eurydice (French version) by Gluck (2002, released 2004, Archiv) - Eurydice

and DVD/TV broadcast
L'incoronazione di Poppea by Monteverdi (2000, DVD) - Poppea
Die Fledermaus by Johann Strauss II (2001, DVD) - Rosalinde
Platée by Rameau (2002, DVD)  - La Folie & Thalie
Gala Jean-Philippe Rameau - Concert du 20ème anniversaire des Musiciens du Louvre (2003, TV)

Other recordings include:

Herminie by Hector Berlioz, conducted by Philippe Herreweghe (1995, Harmonia Mundi)
Elektra by Richard Strauss conducted by Friedemann Layer (1995, released 2001, Naïve) - Fünfte Magd
Pelléas et Mélisande by Claude Debussy conducted by Jean-Claude Casadesus (1997, Naxos Records) - Mélisande
Complete Songs by Henri Duparc (2000, Timpani)
Cantates de Rome by Maurice Ravel (2000, EMI Classics), conducted by Michel Plasson
Les deux journées by Luigi Cherubini, conducted by Christoph Spering (2002, Opus 111)
Fisch-Ton-Kan by Emmanuel Chabrier, conducted by Roger Delage (1992, Arion)

Delunsch has also appeared in a number of opera telecasts.

References

Naxos discography for Delunsch, accessed 21 January 2010 
MusicWeb review of Pierre Bartholomée's La Lumière Antigone with Delunsch, accessed 21 January 2010

External links
Site officiel

Mireille Delunsch Agence Artistique Cedelle

Living people
1962 births
Musicians from Mulhouse
French operatic sopranos
Chevaliers of the Légion d'honneur
20th-century French women opera singers
21st-century French women opera singers
French performers of early music
Women performers of early music